Wilhelm August Lampadius was born in Hehlen, Braunschweig-Wolfenbüttel, on 8 August 1772 and died on 13 April 1842 in Freiberg, Kingdom of Saxony. He was a German pharmacist in Göttingen from 1785 until 1791. Also he was an "extraordinary professor" of chemistry and mineralogy in 1794 and an "ordinary professor" in 1795. He taught at the Mining Academy in Freiberg.

Lampadius is best known for inflaming the first coal gas lantern on European ground.

Life and work
Lampadius completed in five years (started in 1785) his qualifications and became a pharmacist by completing the exam. At the University of Göttingen (1791–92) he was taught by Johann Friedrich Gmelin and Georg Christoph Lichtenberg.
After that he got to know Martin Heinrich Klaproth and Sigismund Friedrich Hermbstädt in Berlin. At the same time Joachim Graf von Sternberg offered Lampadius to accompany him on a research travel to Russia and China. Their trip stopped in Moscow because they did not get the permission to enter interior Russia. So Lampadius followed von Sternberg to his possessions in Bohemia. There he worked as a chemist for the ironworks in Radwitz.

   
Klaproth helped him to become a professor's assistant at the mining academy in Freiberg. He specialized himself for metallurgical chemistry. Abraham Gottlob Werner recommended Lampadius and he was named as a professor for metallurgy.
In 1811/12 Lampadius illuminated his street in front of his house in Freiberg with the first hard coal gas lantern in Europe.

Chemistry 
In 1796 he accidentally obtained carbon disulfide (Schwefelalcohol) by destilling iron pyrites with moist charcoal. He concluded that sulphur and hydrogen are the source materials for the 'alcohol of sulphur'. He is regarded as the discoverer for "alcohol sulfuris".
He figured out that lead dissolves in acids more easily, if it is alloyed with tin. His discovery lead him to realize the harmfulness of many plates and pans then used in food preparation and presentation.
He dealt also with researches about the fodder beet sugar.

Literature 
 „Lampadius, Wilhelm August" by Albert Ladenburg in: Allgemeine Deutsche Biographie, edited by "the historical commission of the Bavarian Academy of science", Band 17 (1883), S. 578–579, digital full-text edition on Wikisource, URL: http://de.wikisource.org/w/index.php?title=ADB:Lampadius,_Wilhelm_August&oldid=2267074
 "Lampadius" In: Partington: History of Chemistry, Volume three, London 1962, p. 596-597.

Web-Link 
 Dietrich, Richard, "Lampadius, Wilhelm August" in: Neue Deutsche Biographie 13 (1982), S. 456 f. [Onlinefassung]; URL: http://www.deutsche-biographie.de/ppn118726145.html
 „Lampadius, Wilhelm August" von Albert Ladenburg in: Allgemeine Deutsche Biographie, herausgegeben von der Historischen Kommission bei der Bayerischen Akademie der Wissenschaften, Band 17 (1883), S. 578–579, Digitale Volltext-Ausgabe in Wikisource, URL: http://de.wikisource.org/w/index.php?title=ADB:Lampadius,_Wilhelm_August&oldid=2267074

References

External links 
 nature.com 
 de.wikisource.org 
 for pictures: German Wikipedia Wilhelm August Lampadius

German pharmacists
1772 births
1842 deaths
People from Holzminden (district)
University of Göttingen alumni
19th-century German chemists
18th-century German chemists